Himesháza is a village in Baranya county, Hungary.
Until the end of World War II, the majority of the Inhabitants was Danube Swabians, also called locally as Stifolder, because there Ancestors once came at the 17th century and 18th century from Fulda (district). Mostly of the former German Settlers was expelled to Allied-occupied Germany and Allied-occupied Austria in 1945–1948, about the Potsdam Agreement.
Only a few Germans of Hungary live there, the majority today are the descendants of Hungarians from the Czechoslovak–Hungarian population exchange.

Notable people 
 Norbert Michelisz, racing driver

Literature 
Michael Mott (Fulda): Fuldaer Einwanderer in Himesháza/Ungarn, in: "Buchenblätter" Fuldaer Zeitung, 59. Jahrg., Nr. 16, 20. Juni 1986, S. 61,62;Nr. 17, 4. Juli 1986, S. 67,68.

References

External links 
 Local statistics 

Populated places in Baranya County